Shurenga is a rural locality (a village) in Plesetsky District, Arkhangelsk Oblast, Russia. The population was 178 as of 2010.

Geography 
Shurenga is located 71 km southwest of Plesetsk (the district's administrative centre) by road. Trufanovskaya is the nearest rural locality.

References 

Rural localities in Plesetsky District